Edward Michael Harrington Jr. (February 24, 1928 – July 31, 1989) was an American democratic socialist. As a writer, he was perhaps best known as the author of The Other America. Harrington was also a political activist, theorist, professor of political science, and radio commentator. He was a founding member of the Democratic Socialists of America, and its most influential early leader.

Biography

Early life and education 
Harrington was born in St. Louis, Missouri, on February 24, 1928, to an Irish-American family. He attended Roch Catholic School and St. Louis University High School, where he was a classmate (class of 1944) of Thomas Anthony Dooley III. He later graduated from College of the Holy Cross and the University of Chicago (MA in English literature), and attended Yale Law School. 

As a young man, Harrington was interested in both leftist politics and Catholicism. He joined Dorothy Day's Catholic Worker Movement, a communal movement that stressed social justice and nonviolence. Harrington enjoyed arguing about culture and politics, and his Jesuit education had made him a good debater and rhetorician.

Harrington was an editor of the newspaper Catholic Worker from 1951 to 1953, but he soon became disillusioned with religion. Although he always retained a certain affection for Catholic culture, he ultimately became an atheist.

Career

Harrington's estrangement from religion was accompanied by an increasing interest in Marxism and secular socialism. After leaving The Catholic Worker, Harrington became a member of the Independent Socialist League (ISL), a small organization associated with the former Trotskyist activist Max Shachtman. Harrington and Shachtman believed that socialism, which they believed implied a just and fully democratic society, could not be realized by authoritarian communism, and were fiercely critical of the "bureaucratic collectivist" states in Eastern Europe and elsewhere.

In 1955, Harrington was placed on the FBI Index, whose master list contained more than 10 million names in 1939. From the 1950s through to the 1970s, FBI director J. Edgar Hoover added an untold number of names of U.S. liberation activists he considered "dangerous characters", to be placed in detention camps in case of a national emergency. Later, Harrington was added to the master list of Nixon political opponents.

After Norman Thomas's Socialist Party absorbed Shachtman's ISL in 1957, Harrington endorsed Shachtman's strategy of working as part of the Democratic Party rather than sponsoring candidates as Socialists. Although Harrington identified personally with the socialism of Thomas and Eugene Debs, the most consistent thread running through his life and his work was a "left wing of the possible within the Democratic Party."

Harrington served as the first editor of New America, the official weekly newspaper of the Socialist Party-Social Democratic Federation, founded in October 1960. In 1962, he published The Other America: Poverty in the United States, a book that has been credited with sparking John F. Kennedy's and Lyndon Johnson's War on Poverty. For The Other America, Harrington was awarded a George Polk Award and The Sidney Award. He became a widely read intellectual and political writer, in 1972 publishing a second bestseller, Socialism. His voluminous writings included 14 other books and scores of articles, published in such journals as Commonweal, Partisan Review, The New Republic, Commentary (magazine), and The Nation.

Harrington often debated classical liberals/libertarians like Milton Friedman and conservatives like William F. Buckley, Jr. He also debated younger left-wing radicals.

Harrington was present in June 1962 at the founding conference of Students for a Democratic Society. In clashes with Tom Hayden and Alan Haber, he argued that their Port Huron Statement was insufficiently explicit about excluding communists from their vision of a New Left. Arthur M. Schlesinger, Sr. called Harrington the "only responsible radical" in America. Ted Kennedy said, "I see Michael Harrington as delivering the Sermon on the Mount to America," and "among veterans in the War on Poverty, no one has been a more loyal ally when the night was darkest."

By the early 1970s, the governing faction of the Socialist Party continued to endorse a negotiated peace to end the Vietnam War, a stance that Harrington came to believe was no longer viable. The majority changed the organization's name to Social Democrats, USA. After losing at the convention, Harrington resigned and, with his former caucus, formed the Democratic Socialist Organizing Committee.  A smaller faction, associated with peace activist David McReynolds, formed the Socialist Party USA.

Harrington was appointed a professor of political science at Queens College in Flushing, New York City, in 1972. He wrote 16 books and was named a distinguished professor of political science in 1988. Harrington is also credited with coining the term neoconservatism in 1973.

Harrington said that socialists had to go through the Democratic Party to enact their policies, reasoning that the socialist vote had declined from a peak of approximately one million in the years around World War I to a few thousand by the 1950s. He considered running for the Democratic presidential nomination in 1980 against President Jimmy Carter, but decided against it after Senator Ted Kennedy announced his campaign. He later endorsed Kennedy and said, "if Kennedy loses or is driven out of this campaign, it will be a loss for the left".

In 1982, the Democratic Socialist Organizing Committee merged with the New American Movement, an organization of New Left activists, forming the Democratic Socialists of America. It was the principal U.S. affiliate of the Socialist International, which includes socialist and labour parties such as the Swedish and German Social Democrats and the British Labour Party, until it voted to leave in 2017. Harrington remained chairman of DSA from its inception to his death.

During the 1980s, Harrington contributed commentaries to National Public Radio.

Death 
Harrington died of esophageal cancer in Larchmont, New York, on July 31, 1989.

Political views 
Harrington embraced a democratic interpretation of the writings of Karl Marx while rejecting the "actually existing" systems of the Soviet Union, China and the Eastern Bloc. In the 1980s, Harrington said: 

Harrington made clear that even if the traditional Marxist vision of a marketless, stateless society was impossible, he did not understand why this had to "result in the social consequence of some people eating while others starve".

Before the Soviet Union's collapse, the DSA voiced opposition to that nation's bureaucratically managed economy and control over its satellite states. The DSA welcomed Mikhail Gorbachev's reforms in the Soviet Union. Sociologist Bogdan Denitch wrote in the DSA's Democratic Left (quoted in 1989):

Harrington voiced admiration for German Social Democratic Chancellor Willy Brandt's Ostpolitik, which sought to reduce antagonism between Western Europe and Soviet states.

Personal life 
From May 30, 1963, until his death, Harrington was married to Stephanie Gervis Harrington, a freelance writer and staff writer for the Village Voice. Gervis Harrington published articles in The New Yorker, New York Magazine, The Nation, The New York Times Magazine, Harper's, The New Republic, The Village Voice, Vogue, Cosmopolitan, Newsday and other publications. After Harrington's death, she raised their two children and continued her work as a writer. Gervis Harrington died on November 8, 2008, at age 71.

Religion 
In 1978, the periodical Christian Century quoted Harrington:

Harrington observed of himself and his high school classmate Tom Dooley, "each of us was motivated, in part at least, by the Jesuit inspiration of our adolescence that insisted so strenuously that a man must live his philosophy."

In his 1983 Wilson Quarterly article "The Politics at God's Funeral", Harrington wrote that religion was passing into oblivion, but he worried that the passing of legitimizing religious authority made Western societies lose a basis for virtue or common values. He proposed that democratic socialism help create a moral framework to salvage the values of progressive Judaism and Christianity "but not in religious form.”

In 1988, Harrington wrote:

Legacy 
The City University of New York has established The Michael Harrington Center for Democratic Values and Social Change at Queens College in his honor.

Media appearances
 Harrington was a guest speaker on the television series Free to Choose and argued against some of Milton Friedman's theories of the free market.
 In 1966 he appeared on William F. Buckley, Jr.'s television program Firing Line. He explained his opinions on poverty and debated Buckley on government attempts to address poverty and its consequences.

Works
 The Other America: Poverty in the United States. New York: Macmillan, 1962.
 The Retail Clerks. New York: John Wiley, 1962.
 The Accidental Century. New York: Macmillan, 1965.
 "The Politics of Poverty," in Irving Howe (ed.), The Radical Papers. Garden City, NY: Doubleday & Co., 1966; pp. 122–43.
 The Social-Industrial Complex. New York: League for Industrial Democracy, 1968.
 Toward a Democratic Left: A Radical Program for a New Majority. New York: Macmillan, 1968; Baltimore: Penguin, 1969 paperback ed., with new afterword.
 
 Fragments of the Century: A Social Autobiography. New York: Saturday Review Press, 1973.
 Twilight of Capitalism. New York: Simon & Schuster, 1977.
 The Vast Majority. New York: Simon & Schuster, 1977.
 Tax Policy and the Economy: A Debate between Michael Harrington and Representative Jack Kemp, April 25, 1979., with Jack Kemp, New York: Institute for Democratic Socialism, 1979.
 James H. Cone, "The Black Church and Marxism: what do they have to say to each other", with comments by Michael Harrington, New York: Institute for Democratic Socialism, 1980.
 Decade of Decision: The Crisis of the American System. New York: Touchstone, 1981.
 The Next America: The Decline and Rise of the United States. New York: Touchstone, 1981.
 The Politics at God's Funeral: The Spiritual Crisis of Western Civilization. New York: Henry Holt, 1983.
 The New American Poverty. New York: Holt, Rinehart, Winston, 1984.
 Taking Sides: The Education of a Militant Mind. New York: Holt, Rinehart, Winston, 1985.
 The Next Left: The History of a Future. New York: Henry Holt, 1986.
 The Long Distance Runner: An Autobiography. New York: Henry Holt, 1988.
 Socialism: Past & Future, New York: Arcade Publishing, 1989

Biography
Isserman, Maurice The Other American: The Life of Michael Harrington.  New York: Perseus Books 2001
Doug Greene, A Failure of Vision: Michael Harrington and the Limits of Democratic Socialism. Winchester, UK: Zero Books, 2021.

See also
 Bernt Carlsson
 Democratic Socialists of America
 New American Movement
 Socialist Youth League

References

Further reading
 Maurice Isserman, The Other American : The Untold Life of Michael Harrington. New York: HarperCollins/Public Affairs, 2000.
 George Novack, "The Politics of Michael Harrington," International Socialist Review, vol. 34, no. 1 (Jan. 1973), pp. 18–25.
 Doug Greene, A Failure of Vision: Michael Harrington and the Limits of Democratic Socialism. Winchester, UK: Zero Books, 2021.

External links

Michael Harrington Center at Queens College, NYC 
Michael Harrington Archive at marxists.org
Tribute to Michael Harrington, C-SPAN  (November 10, 1989)
Michael Harrington Papers at Tamiment Library and Robert F. Wagner Labor Archives at New York University
 Fathom Journal - Democratic Socialism, Israel and the Jews: An Interview with Michael Harrington (1975), with new preface by Mitchell Cohen (2020)

1928 births
1989 deaths
20th-century American male writers
20th-century American non-fiction writers
20th-century atheists
Activists from New York (state)
Activists from St. Louis
American anti-communists
American anti–Vietnam War activists
American atheists
American male non-fiction writers
American people of Irish descent
American political activists
American political party founders
American political philosophers
American political writers
American social democrats
College of the Holy Cross alumni
Deaths from cancer in New York (state)
Deaths from esophageal cancer
Former Roman Catholics
Members of the Democratic Socialists of America
Members of the Socialist Party of America
New York (state) socialists
People from Larchmont, New York
Queens College, City University of New York faculty
University of Chicago alumni
Writers from St. Louis
Yale Law School alumni